The Hampton Court Beauties are a series of eight portraits by Sir Godfrey Kneller, commissioned by Queen Mary II of England, depicting the most glamorous ladies from the court of William III. They adorn the state rooms of King William III at Hampton Court Palace.

They were probably originally commissioned to hang in the "water room" at Hampton court, however after his wife's death in 1694, William moved them to "the eating room downstairs" where they currently hang.

Hampton Court also houses the Windsor Beauties by Sir Peter Lely, depicting the most beautiful ladies of the court of King Charles II of England, a generation before. However unlike the Windsor Beauties, the Hampton Court Beauties were not mistresses of the King, but attendants to Queen Mary. In contrast to the three quarter sized Windsor beauties, they are more formally posed, and full length. They are of a plainer, less erotic style reflecting a more moralistic society, and the desire to "rebrand" the monarchy accordingly.

Later critics such as Hazlitt and Fuseli still found them problematic, Hazlitt describing them as "painted, tawdry", and by 1835 the earlier set of "bold meritricious hussies" had been sent from Windsor to join them at the more informal setting of Hampton Court. Both sets were part of the exhibition "The Wild, the Beautiful and the Damned" in 2012.

The Hampton Court Beauties
Isabella Bennet, Duchess of Grafton (1667–1713),
Margaret Cecil, Countess of Ranelagh (1672–1727),
Carey Fraser, Countess of Peterborough (c.1658–1709),
Frances Whitmore, Lady Middleton (1666–1694),
Mary Scrope, later Mrs Pitt (born 1676),
Diana De Vere, Duchess of St Albans (1679–1742),
Lady Mary Bentinck, Countess of Essex (died 1726),
Mary Compton, Countess of Dorset (1669–1691)

See also
 The Windsor Beauties

Notes

References

External links
 The Independent: Carry on, your majesty: Charles II and his court ladies

Paintings by Godfrey Kneller
1690s paintings
Hampton Court Palace
Sets of portraits